The men's marathon swim over a distance of 10 kilometres at the 2012 Olympic Games in London took place on 10 August in the Serpentine at Hyde Park.

Outclassing a vast field of rivals, Tunisia's Oussama Mellouli built a historic milestone as the first ever swimmer to capture Olympic titles in both pool and open water. Around the 7 km mark, Mellouli quickly opened up a three-body-length lead over a small pack of swimmers, and maintained a fast pace to claim his second gold and third career medal in 1:49:55.1. Chasing for two more Olympic medals in a grueling race, Germany's Thomas Lurz finished behind the leader by 3.4 seconds with a silver in 1:49:58.5, while Canada's Richard Weinberger, who pulled off a powerful lead on the first lap, grabbed the bronze in 1:50:00.3.

Greece's Spyridon Gianniotis, the reigning world champion, mounted a spirited challenge against Mellouli, Lurz and Weinberger in pursuit, but dropped back in the last 200 metres to fourth in 1:50:05.3. Enjoying a massive support from the home crowd at Hyde Park, Great Britain's Daniel Fogg struggled to maintain his form after the fourth lap, but pushed himself further from behind with a spectacular swim to claim a fifth spot in 1:50:37.3. Fogg was followed in sixth and seventh respectively by Russian duo Sergey Bolshakov (1:50:40.1) and Vladimir Dyatchin (1:50:42.8), while Lurz's teammate Andreas Waschburger, who led both the third and fourth lap ahead of Mellouli and Weinberger, faded down the stretch to pick up the eighth spot in 1:50:44.4. Bulgaria's four-time Olympian Petar Stoychev finished ninth in 1:50:46.2 to hold off an American open water swimmer Alex Meyer (1:50:48.2) by exactly two seconds.

As the remaining swimmers completed the race, Guam's 16-year-old teen Benjamin Schulte fought off audaciously throughout the open-water course to round out the field with a twenty-fifth place time in 2:03:35.1.

Qualification
The men's 10 km open water marathon at the 2012 Olympics featured a field of 25 swimmers: 
 10: the top-10 finishers in the 10 km race at the 2011 FINA World Championships. 
 9: the top-9 finishers at the 2012 Olympic Marathon Swim Qualifier (8–9 June 2012 in Setúbal, Portugal). 
 5: one representative from each FINA continent (Africa, Americas, Asia, Europe and Oceania). (These were selected based on the finishes at the qualifying race in Setúbal.)
 1: from the host nation (Great Britain) if not qualified by other means. If Great Britain already had a qualifier in the race, this spot was allocated back into the general pool from the 2012 qualifying race.

Results

References

External links
NBC Olympics Coverage
Map of the Course 

Men's 10000 metre marathon
Olympics
Men's events at the 2012 Summer Olympics